The Indonesia President Invitational was an Asian Tour golf tournament. It was played for the first time in October 2007 at the Bumi Serpong Damai Course in Indonesia. The Bumi Serpong Damai Course was designed by Jack Nicklaus. The tournament's main sponsor was Pertamina in 2007 and 2008. In 2009, the purse was US$400,000.

Winners

External links
Coverage on the Asian Tour's official site

Former Asian Tour events
Golf tournaments in Indonesia